Nathaniel H. "Neil" Blatchford, IV (born October 5, 1945) is a retired American speed skater who specialized in the 500 m sprint. In this event he finished in 5th and 15th place at the 1968 and 1972 Winter Olympics, respectively. He finished second in this distance at the 1968 and 1969 world championships. He was the US Intermediate Champion in 1963 and won the All-around title in 1964. 

Personal bests:
500 m – 38.46 (1972)
1000 m – 1:21.7 (1972)
1500 m – 2:12.9 (1972)
5000 m – 8:36.9 (1969)

References

External links
Neil Blatchford. speedskatingstats.com

1945 births
Living people
American male speed skaters
Olympic speed skaters of the United States
Speed skaters at the 1968 Winter Olympics
Speed skaters at the 1972 Winter Olympics
Lake Forest Academy alumni